Fairhead is a surname and may refer to:

Gerry Fairhead, former Canadian sailor who competed in the 1948 Summer Olympics
Rona Fairhead, Chair of the BBC Trust
Charlie Fairhead, character from the UK TV series Casualty, played by Derek Thompson

See also
Fair Head, a headland in County Antrim, United Kingdom.